Peter John Hudson AM (born 19 February 1946) is a former Australian rules footballer who played for the Hawthorn Football Club in the Victorian Football League (VFL) and for the New Norfolk Football Club and Glenorchy Football Club in the Tasmanian Australian National Football League (TANFL).

A legend in the Australian Football Hall of Fame, Hudson is considered one of the greatest full-forwards in the game's history. He holds the highest career goal-per-game average (5.64) in VFL/AFL history, and is only one of two VFL/AFL footballers (the other being ' John Coleman) to average more than 5 goals per game. He was the first VFL/AFL player to kick 100 or more goals in a season five times, equalled Bob Pratt's VFL/AFL record of 150 goals in a season in 1971 and, after the AFL decided to retrospectively recognise the leading VFL goalkickers during the home-and-away season back to 1955, won the Coleman Medal four times.   

Hudson was a superb reader of the play and knew how to use his body well in one-on-one contests. He had a safe pair of hands and although he was known for using the flat punt when kicking for goal, he was usually very accurate.  

Over his career, he kicked 1,721 goals in 288 premiership games between 1963 and 1979, and 1981. His final match was in the 1981 TANFL Preliminary Final for Glenorchy, where Hudson, who had made a brief comeback with two rounds remaining due to Glenorchy having a string of injuries, kicked 30 goals in three matches, including six in his team's Preliminary Final loss to New Norfolk. Hudson was kept goalless just four times during his career in premiership matches by Richmond's Barry Richardson in Round 7 of 1969, Collingwood's Ian Cooper in Round 2 of 1974, Carlton's Rod Austin in Round 14 of 1977 and in the TANFL, Bruce Greenhill of Sandy Bay in 1978.

Some sources list Hudson as playing 107 games and kicking 769 goals for Glenorchy for a TANFL total of 185 games and 1,147 goals, and a career total of 314 games and 1,875 goals. These discrepancies arise from the TANFL including goals scored in intrastate matches representing the TANFL in TANFL player's career statistics at that time, a ruling that was later rescinded.

If the Tasmanian competitions, representative and night series games are considered, Hudson played an overall total of 372 matches and kicked 2,191 goals – an average of 5.89 goals a game over his entire career – making him the highest goalkicker in elite Australian rules football history.

Hudson also experienced success as a coach during and after his playing days, leading Glenorchy to a TANFL premiership as playing coach and later coaching Hobart to successive finals appearances.

Early life 
Peter Hudson was born in 1946 in New Norfolk, Tasmania.

VFL career 
After sitting out the first game of 1967 as he didn't meet the league's residential requirements, Hudson's first game was against . Lining up against rugged full-back Wes Lofts, he managed to kick four goals. 

In 1971 he equalled Bob Pratt's record of 150 goals in a season after kicking three goals in Hawthorn's winning Grand Final side. Hudson kicked into the man-on-the-mark Barry Lawrence (St Kilda) in one of his attempts to break the record during the grand final.

In the first round of 1972 he seriously injured his knee just before half time. He had already kicked 8 goals and had just taken a mark within distance when he fell awkwardly. It was thought that his career had finished.

On 25 August 1973 he returned from Tasmania to kick eight goals against Collingwood at VFL Park. After playing Rounds 1 and 2 in 1974, he again injured his knee and returned to Tasmania.  After hurting his knee playing netball later that year he decided to have knee surgery in the summer. He did not play another VFL game until lured back for the 1977 season when he ended up kicking 110 goals for the season.

VFL statistics

|-
| 1967 || |  || 26
| 17 || 57 || bgcolor=CAE1FF | 55† || 179 || 29 || 208 || 90 || 3.4 || bgcolor=CAE1FF | 3.2† || 10.5 || 1.7 || 12.2 || 5.3 ||  3
|-
| 1968 || |  || 26
| 19 || bgcolor=CAE1FF | 125† || bgcolor=CAE1FF | 62† || 274 || 31 || 305 || 113 || bgcolor=CAE1FF | 6.6† || bgcolor=CAE1FF | 3.3† || 14.4 || 1.6 || 16.1 || 5.9 ||  16
|-
| 1969 || |  || 26
| 19 || 120 || 40 || 217 || 16 || 233 || 111 || bgcolor=CAE1FF | 6.3† || 2.1 || 11.4 || 0.8 || 12.3 || 5.8 || 8
|-
| 1970 ||  || 26
| 22 || bgcolor=CAE1FF | 146† || 44 || 282 || 19 || 301 || 140 || bgcolor=CAE1FF | 6.6† || 2.0 || 12.8 || 0.9 || 13.7 || 6.4 || 14
|-
| bgcolor=F0E68C | 1971# ||  || 26
| 24 || bgcolor=CAE1FF | 150† || 72 || 346 || 41 || 387 || 180 || bgcolor=CAE1FF | 6.3† || 3.0 || 14.4 || 1.7 || 16.1 || 7.5 || 18
|-
| 1972 ||  || 26
| 1 || 8 || 1 || 12 || 1 || 13 || 9 || 8.0 || 1.0 || 12.0 || 1.0 || 13.0 || 9.0 || 1 
|-
| 1973 ||  || 26
| 1 || 8 || 3 || 15 || 0 || 15 || 10 || 8.0 || 3.0 || 15.0 || 0.0 || 15.0 || 10.0 || 2
|-
| 1974 ||  || 26
| 2 || 3 || 3 || 10 || 7 || 17 || 6 || 1.5 || 1.5 || 5.0 || 3.5 || 8.5 || 3.0 || 0
|-
| 1977 ||  || 1
| 24 || bgcolor=CAE1FF | 110† || 50 || 243 || 32 || 275 || 123 || bgcolor=CAE1FF | 4.6† || 2.3 || 10.1 || 1.3 || 11.5 || 5.1 || 16
|- class="sortbottom"
! colspan=3 | Career
! 129 !! 727 !! 330 !! 1578 !! 176 !! 1754 !! 782 !! 5.6 !! 2.6 !! 12.2 !! 1.4 !! 13.6 !! 6.1 !! 78
|}

Honours and achievements
Team
 VFL Premiership player: 1971
 Minor premiership: 1971
 TANFL Premiership player (Glenorchy): 1975

Individual
 4× Coleman Medal: 1968, 1970, 1971, 1977
 2× J.J. Dennis Memorial Trophy: 1968, 1970
 6× Hawthorn leading goalkicker: 1967, 1968, 1969, 1970, 1971, 1977
 2× All-Australian team: 1966, 1969
 2× William Leitch Medal: 1978, 1979
 New Norfolk best and fairest: 1965
 3× Glenorchy best and fairest: 1976, 1978, 1979
 8× TFL leading goalkicker: 1963, 1964, 1965, 1966, 1975, 1976, 1978, 1979
 4× New Norfolk leading goalkicker: 1963, 1964, 1965, 1966
 4× Glenorchy leading goalkicker: 1975, 1976, 1978, 1979
 Australian Football Hall of Fame – Legend status
 Tasmanian Football Hall of Fame Icon
 Hawthorn Hall of Fame – Legend status
 Hawthorn Team of the Century
 Tasmanian Team of the Century
 Hawthorn life member

Post VFL 
Hudson coached and played for Glenorchy Football Club in the TFL in 1975 and 1976, taking them to a premiership in his first year. Following his second return from the VFL, in 1978 he once again played for Glenorchy, kicking 153 goals and winning the highest individual honour in the TFL, the William Leitch Medal. In the next season he again topped the goalkicking with 179 goals, winning his second William Leitch medal. He retired as a player at the end of the season. He coached Hobart in the TFL in 1986–1987 for consecutive unsuccessful finals campaigns.

In 1979, he was made a Member of the Order of Australia (AM) in the Australia Day Honours, for services to Australian football.

He was inducted into the Australian Football Hall of Fame in 1996 and elevated to "Legend" status in 1999. His citation reads: "A freakish full-forward who just kept accumulating goals. Made brilliant use of the body, was deadly accurate and had an amazing ability to read the play. Holds the best goals per game average (5.59) in VFL/AFL history and in 1971 matched Bob Pratt's record for most goals in a season with 150."

Hudson is well respected for his business acumen. Since retirement he has had a stint as the Chief Executive Officer at Hawthorn and St Kilda. Currently he is a senior executive of insurance giant Bupa.

Hudson was inducted into the Sport Australia Hall of Fame in 2001.

Hudson is depicted in a Tasmanian state guernsey taking a mark against South Australia in Jamie Cooper's painting the Game That Made Australia, commissioned by the AFL in 2008 to celebrate the 150th anniversary of the sport

In 2010, Hudson became the eleventh player to feature in a Toyota Memorable Moments advertisement with Stephen Curry and Dave Lawson, comically re-enacting his unsuccessful attempt to break Bob Pratt's goal-kicking record in the 1971 VFL Grand Final.

Family
His son Paul also played for the Hawthorn Football Club, Western Bulldogs and Richmond Football Club, and nephew Simon Minton-Connell also played AFL football for the Carlton Football Club, Sydney Swans, Hawthorn Football Club and Western Bulldogs.

See also 
 List of Australian rules football families

References

Further reading

External links 

 

 AFL Hall of Fame - Legends section
 AFL official statistics

1946 births
Living people
Australian rules footballers from Tasmania
Hawthorn Football Club players
Hawthorn Football Club Premiership players
Hawthorn Football Club administrators
Peter Crimmins Medal winners
Coleman Medal winners
All-Australians (1953–1988)
Tasmanian State of Origin players
Glenorchy Football Club players
New Norfolk Football Club players
Hobart Football Club coaches
Glenorchy Football Club coaches
William Leitch Medal winners
Members of the Order of Australia
Australian Football Hall of Fame inductees
Sport Australia Hall of Fame inductees
Tasmanian Football Hall of Fame inductees
One-time VFL/AFL Premiership players